Dominic Walker may refer to:
 Dominic Walker (radio presenter), British radio presenter
 Dominic Walker (bishop) (born 1948), Bishop of Monmouth
 Dominic Walker (actor) in The Power of One (film)